Riaz Khan (born 2 April 1976) is a Pakistani politician who had been a member of the Provincial Assembly of Khyber Pakhtunkhwa from August 2018 till January 2023. He beat Maulana Fazli Ghafoor and Bakht Jehan Khan in the 2018 general elections.

Political career
He was elected to the Provincial Assembly of Khyber Pakhtunkhwa as a candidate of Pakistan Tehreek-e-Insaf from Constituency PK-20 (Buner-I) in 2018 Pakistani general election.

References

Living people
Pakistan Tehreek-e-Insaf MPAs (Khyber Pakhtunkhwa)
People from Buner District
1976 births